The M602 motorway is a  motorway, leading traffic into Salford, Greater Manchester, England, towards Manchester and by-passing the suburban town of Eccles.

History
The first section from Worsley to Eccles (now Junction 2) opened in 1971, and the second section from Eccles to Ordsall was completed in 1982.

The motorway itself was originally intended to be a part of a bigger scheme, the South Lancashire Motorway. To be designated M52, the route would have linked Liverpool and Manchester, and would have been built to provide links to the growing UK motorway network.

However, at the same time, the M62 was being extended north and east of Worsley, around the north of Manchester, and on to Yorkshire, to form part of the Trans-Pennine Motorway route. This would be an upgraded version of the original plan of the East Lancashire Road, the A580, but would link onto the existing route at Worsley. It was decided that the Trans-Pennine Motorway be extended to Liverpool too, to provide a cross-country trunk route. The M62 was re-routed to run via the route of the M52 between Worsley and Liverpool. That left a short stump of the original M52 between the M62 and Ordsall, which was initially renumbered M64 and then became the M602. The southern end of the M62 between Worsley and Stretford became the M63 and later the M60.

List of junctions
{| class="plainrowheaders wikitable"
|-
!scope=col|County
!scope=col|Location
!scope=col|mi
!scope=col|km
!scope=col|Junction
!scope=col|Destinations
!scope=col|Notes
|-
|rowspan="3"|Greater Manchester
|rowspan="2"|Eccles
|0
|0
|1
|  - Liverpool  - Manchester Outer Ring Road
|
|-
|1.5
|2.4
|2
| - Trafford Park, Salford
|
|-
|Salford
|2.4
|3.9
|3
|  - Old Trafford, Salford  - Central Manchester 
|

*Ceremonial Counties
Coordinate list

References

External links

 CBRD Motorway Database – M602
CBRD Videos M602 / A57(M)
Lancashire County Council – Historic Highways – M602
 The Motorway Archive – M602
 Pathetic Motorways – M602

Motorways in England
Roads in Greater Manchester